Thapsia gummifera (syn. Margotia gummifera) is a species of flowering plant in the family Apiaceae, native to the western Mediterranean; Portugal, Spain, Morocco, Algeria, and Tunisia. As its synonym Margotia gummifera it has been proposed as a candidate for the extinct plant known in antiquity as silphium.

References

Apioideae
Flora of Portugal
Flora of Spain
Flora of Morocco
Flora of Algeria
Flora of Tunisia
Plants described in 1818